This is a list of winners and nominees of the Primetime Emmy Award for Outstanding Lead Actress in a Comedy Series. Beginning with the 18th Primetime Emmy Awards, leading actresses in comedy have competed alone. However, these comedic performances included actresses from miniseries, telefilms, and guest performers competing against main cast competitors. Such instances are marked below:

 # – Indicates a performance in a Miniseries or Television film, prior to the category's creation
 § – Indicates a performance as a guest performer, prior to the category's creation

The 71st Primetime Emmy Awards are the first Emmys where there is no representation from any of the big four broadcast networks.

Winners and nominations

1950s

1960s

1970s

1980s

1990s

2000s

2010s

2020s

Superlatives

Programs with multiple wins

6 wins
 Veep

5 wins
 Murphy Brown

4 wins
 Mad About You

3 wins
 All in the Family
 Father Knows Best
 The Golden Girls
 The Mary Tyler Moore Show

2 wins
 Cheers
 The Dick Van Dyke Show
 Everybody Loves Raymond
 The Ghost & Mrs. Muir
 Hacks
 Hazel
 Kate & Allie
 The Lucy Show
 Taxi

Performers with multiple wins

7 wins
 Julia Louis-Dreyfus (6 consecutive)

5 wins
 Candice Bergen (2 consecutive twice)
 Mary Tyler Moore (2 consecutive twice)

4 wins
 Helen Hunt (consecutive)

3 wins
 Lucille Ball (2 consecutive)
 Jean Stapleton (2 consecutive)
 Jane Wyatt (consecutive)

2 wins
 Bea Arthur 
 Shirley Booth (consecutive)
 Jane Curtin (consecutive)
 Patricia Heaton (consecutive)
 Hope Lange (consecutive)
 Jean Smart (consecutive)

Programs with multiple nominations

15 nominations
 The Golden Girls

9 nominations
 Cheers

8 nominations
 All in the Family

7 nominations
 30 Rock
 Everybody Loves Raymond
 The Jeffersons
 Mad About You
 Malcolm in the Middle
 The Mary Tyler Moore Show
 Murphy Brown
 Soap
 Veep

6 nominations
 Bewitched
 Nurse Jackie
 Parks and Recreation
 Sex and the City

5 nominations
 Black-ish
 The Days and Nights of Molly Dodd
 Grace and Frankie
 Kate & Allie
 Maude
 The New Adventures of Old Christine
 Will & Grace

4 nominations
 Desperate Housewives
 The Donna Reed Show
 Ellen
 The George Burns and Gracie Allen Show
 Home Improvement
 I Love Lucy
 The Loretta Young Show
 The Lucy Show
 The Marvelous Mrs. Maisel
 Rhoda
 Roseanne
 That Girl

3 nominations
 Ally McBeal
 Cybill
 Dead to Me
 Dharma & Greg
 The Dick Van Dyke Show
 Father Knows Best
 Friends
 Girls
 Hazel
 Insecure
 Mike & Molly
 Mom
 Our Miss Brooks
 Private Secretary
 Taxi
 Weeds

2 nominations
 Better Things
 The Beverly Hillbillies
 The Bob Newhart Show
 Brooklyn Bridge
 The Comeback
 The Cosby Show
 December Bride
 Designing Women
 The Flight Attendant
 Get Smart
 The Ghost & Mrs. Muir
 Gimme a Break!
 Hacks
 Inside Amy Schumer
 Love, Sidney
 Mr. Adams and Eve
 The Nanny
 Samantha Who?
 Schitt's Creek
 Ugly Betty
 Unbreakable Kimmy Schmidt
 United States of Tara

Performers with multiple nominations

12 nominations
 Julia Louis-Dreyfus

10 nominations
 Mary Tyler Moore

9 nominations
 Bea Arthur

8 nominations
 Lucille Ball
 Jean Stapleton

7 nominations
 Candice Bergen
 Tina Fey
 Patricia Heaton
 Helen Hunt
 Jane Kaczmarek
 Isabel Sanford
 Betty White

6 nominations
 Kirstie Alley
 Edie Falco
 Sarah Jessica Parker
 Amy Poehler

5 nominations
 Blair Brown
 Debra Messing
 Elizabeth Montgomery
 Tracee Ellis Ross

4 nominations
 Gracie Allen
 Eve Arden
 Christina Applegate
 Roseanne Barr
 Rachel Brosnahan
 Ellen DeGeneres
 Valerie Harper
 Katherine Helmond
 Shelley Long
 Rue McClanahan
 Donna Reed
 Patricia Richardson
 Ann Sothern
 Marlo Thomas
 Lily Tomlin
 Loretta Young

3 nominations
 Jennifer Aniston
 Shirley Booth
 Jane Curtin
 Cathryn Damon
 Lena Dunham
 Jenna Elfman
 Calista Flockhart
 Allison Janney
 Melissa McCarthy
 Mary-Louise Parker
 Issa Rae
 Cybill Shepherd
 Jane Wyatt

2 nominations
 Pamela Adlon
 Delta Burke
 Spring Byington
 Nell Carter
 Toni Collette
 Kaley Cuoco
 Fran Drescher
 Barbara Feldon
 America Ferrera
 Felicity Huffman
 Ellie Kemper
 Lisa Kudrow
 Swoosie Kurtz
 Hope Lange
 Ida Lupino
 Catherine O'Hara
 Suzanne Pleshette
 Phylicia Rashad
 Marion Ross
 Irene Ryan
 Susan Saint James
 Amy Schumer
 Jean Smart

Total awards by network
 CBS – 26
 NBC – 16
 HBO/HBO Max – 9
 ABC – 7
 Showtime – 2
 Amazon – 2
 Pop TV - 1

See also
 Primetime Emmy Award for Outstanding Lead Actor in a Comedy Series
 Primetime Emmy Award for Outstanding Lead Actress in a Drama Series
 Golden Globe Award for Best Actress – Television Series Musical or Comedy
 Screen Actors Guild Award for Outstanding Performance by a Female Actor in a Comedy Series

Notes

References

Lead Actress - Comedy Series
Outstanding Performance by a Lead Actress in a Comedy Series Primetime Emmy Award winners
Emmy Award